In signal processing, the Nyquist frequency (or folding frequency), named after Harry Nyquist, is a characteristic of a sampler, which converts a continuous function or signal into a discrete sequence. For a given sampling rate (samples per second), the Nyquist frequency (cycles per second) is the frequency whose cycle-length (or period) is twice the interval between samples, thus 0.5 cycle/sample.  For example, audio CDs have a sampling rate of 44100 samples/second.  At 0.5 cycle/sample, the corresponding Nyquist frequency is 22050 cycles/second (Hz).  Conversely, the Nyquist rate for sampling a 22050 Hz signal is 44100 samples/second. 

When the highest frequency (bandwidth) of a signal is less than the Nyquist frequency of the sampler, the resulting discrete-time sequence is said to be free of the distortion known as aliasing, and the corresponding sample rate is said to be above the Nyquist rate for that particular signal.

In a typical application of sampling, one first chooses the highest frequency to be preserved and recreated, based on the expected content (voice, music, etc.) and desired fidelity. Then one inserts an anti-aliasing filter ahead of the sampler. Its job is to attenuate the frequencies above that limit. Finally, based on the characteristics of the filter, one chooses a sample rate (and corresponding Nyquist frequency) that will provide an acceptably small amount of aliasing.  In applications where the sample rate is pre-determined (such as the CD rate), the filter is chosen based on the Nyquist frequency, rather than vice versa.

Folding frequency 

The black dot plotted at  represents the amplitude and frequency of a sinusoidal function whose frequency is 60% of the sample rate. The other three dots indicate the frequencies and amplitudes of three other sinusoids that would produce the same set of samples as the actual sinusoid that was sampled.

The red lines depict the paths (loci) of the 4 dots if we were to adjust the frequency and amplitude of the sinusoid along the solid red segment (between    and  ).  No matter what function we choose to change the amplitude vs frequency, the graph will exhibit symmetry between 0 and     This symmetry is commonly referred to as folding, and another name for    (the Nyquist frequency) is folding frequency.

Other meanings
Early uses of the term Nyquist frequency, such as those cited above, are all consistent with the definition presented in this article. Some later publications, including some respectable textbooks, call twice the signal bandwidth the Nyquist frequency; this is a distinctly minority usage, and the frequency at twice the signal bandwidth is otherwise commonly referred to as the Nyquist rate.

Notes

References

Digital signal processing